The Chinese bush warbler (Locustella tacsanowskia) is an Old World warbler in the family Locustellidae. The species was first described by Robert Swinhoe in 1871. It breeds in the East Palearctic (East Siberia to Tibet and South China); it winters to Northeast India, Yunnan and Southeast Asia.
Its natural habitat is temperate forests.

References

Chinese bush warbler
Birds of China
Birds of East Asia
Chinese bush warbler
Taxonomy articles created by Polbot